Hempfield School District is a school district of 6800+ students educated in 10 schools by 500+ teachers in Lancaster County, Pennsylvania.  It is a member of Lancaster-Lebanon Intermediate Unit (IU) 13.

References

External links 
 

School districts in Lancaster County, Pennsylvania